Konstantin Aleksandrovich Trutovsky (Ukrainian: Костянтин Олександрович Трутовській, Russian: Константин Александрович Трутовский; 9 February 1826, in Kursk – 29 March 1893, in Yakovlevka, Oboyansky District, Kursk Oblast) was a Ukrainian genre painter and illustrator.

Biography 

He was born to a retired cavalry captain who was also a landowner. His primary education was in Kharkiv then, after his father's death, he was taken to Saint Petersburg in 1839, where he was enrolled at the Nikolaevsky Engineering Academy and his aptitude for drawing was first displayed.

He graduated in 1845, and began to attend classes at the Imperial Academy of Arts with Fyodor Bruni, intending to become a history painter. Soon, however, he discovered a preference for painting scenes from everyday life.

While there, he made the first known portrait of Fyodor Dostoyevsky, (his former fellow student at the engineering school), became involved in the Petrashevsky Circle and narrowly avoided arrest. In 1849 he returned to the relative safety of his family estate, which soon passed to him, following his mother's death. He painted throughout the local villages, visiting Saint Petersburg or Moscow only to arrange exhibitions.

In the early 1850s, he published an Album of Scenes of Little Russian Life and, in 1856, was awarded the title of "Free Artist". In the late 1850s, he toured Germany and became a corresponding member of the "". He settled in Saint Petersburg in 1858, after the death of his second wife, who had become ill during their travels.

In 1861, he was named an "Academician" for his portrayal of a Ukrainian khorovod. From 1871 to 1881, he served as an inspector for the Moscow School of Painting, Sculpture and Architecture then, once again, returned to his estate where he created numerous oils, watercolors and drawings of the landlord class, as well as the peasants. He continued to exhibit abroad; in London, Paris and Antwerp. A major posthumous retrospective was held in Moscow in 1893.

In addition to his paintings, he illustrated several works by Nikolai Gogol, Mikhail Lermontov, Marko Vovchok, Taras Shevchenko and Ivan Krylov. He was related, by his first marriage, to Sergey Aksakov. His third wife was a lateral descendant of Alexander Griboyedov.

Selected paintings

References

External links 

(Ukrainian/Eng) Kostiantyn Oleksandrovych Trutovsky

(Russian) Trutovsky - Old Kursk Fellow Countrymen

(Russian) Konstantin Aleksandrovich Trutovsky:
 TheestinyNofOa ArovincialALrtist ST

1826 births
1893 deaths
Military Engineering-Technical University alumni
19th-century painters from the Russian Empire
Russian male painters
Realist painters
People from Kursk
19th-century male artists from the Russian Empire
Academic staff of the Moscow School of Painting, Sculpture and Architecture